Akkineni Kutumba Rao is an Indian filmmaker known for his work in Telugu parallel cinema. He won two Nandi Awards and one National Film Award.

Filmography
Bhadram Koduko (Telugu)
Thodu (Telugu)
Patha Nagaramlo Pasivadu (Telugu)
Gulabeelu (Telugu)
Amulyam (Telugu)

Television
Manayi - Hindi

Awards
National Film Awards
National Film Award for Best Feature Film in Telugu - Bhadram Koduko

Nandi Awards
 Best Children's Film - Bhadram Koduko (1991)
 Best Children's Film - Patha Nagaramlo Paivadu (1999)

International honours
Certificate of Merit at Cairo International Film Festival - Pathanagaramlo Pasivadu
14th Golden Elephant Film Festival in 2005 - Special Mention - Gulabeelu

References

Living people
Year of birth missing (living people)
Telugu film directors
Film directors from Hyderabad, India
Film producers from Hyderabad, India
Screenwriters from Hyderabad, India
20th-century Indian film directors